Didymostigma is a genus of flowering plants belonging to the family Gesneriaceae.

Its native range is China.

Species:

Didymostigma leiophyllum 
Didymostigma obtusum 
Didymostigma trichanthera

References

Didymocarpoideae
Gesneriaceae genera